Simon Henzler (born 1 December 1976) is a German football coach and former player. He works as goalkeeping coach for Schalke 04.

Career
Henzler was born in Ravensburg. He spent two seasons in the Bundesliga with FC St. Pauli and Arminia Bielefeld.

References

1976 births
Living people
Association football goalkeepers
German footballers
SV Meppen players
FC St. Pauli players
Arminia Bielefeld players
1. FC Union Berlin players
Holstein Kiel players
VfB Stuttgart II players
Bundesliga players
2. Bundesliga players
3. Liga players
FC Schalke 04 non-playing staff
Association football goalkeeping coaches
People from Ravensburg
Sportspeople from Tübingen (region)
Footballers from Baden-Württemberg